Paguthan Combined Cycle Power Plant is located in Bharuch district of Gujarat. The gas based power project is owned by CLP India Private Limited, a subsidiary of CLP Group of People's Republic of China.

The plant was originally owned by Gujarat Paguthan Energy Corporation which was acquired by  CLP India Private Limited in 2002.

Capacity
It has an installed capacity of 655 MW. The plant became fully operational in 1998. It comprises following units.
 Three units of gas turbine, each of 138 MW capacity.
 One unit of steam turbine of 241 MW capacity.

References 

Natural gas-fired power stations in Gujarat
Bharuch district
1998 establishments in Gujarat
Energy infrastructure completed in 1998